Campeonato Nacional de Seniores Masculinos - Segunda Divisão (in English, Men's Senior National Championship - 2nd Division), also known as Andebol 2 or just Segunda Divisão, is the second-tier handball league in Portugal. The best teams get promoted to Andebol 1 and the worst relegated to Portuguese Handball Third Division.

Almada AC is the most successful club, having won the competition four times.

The competition is played over two phases by 30 teams, initially geographically grouped in 3 zone groups.

The current champions are CD São Bernardo, from Aveiro.

History 
The second tier was established in 1966 as a result of the need of expansion of national handball competitions due to the increase in the number of participating teams in the regional championships. The competition was created under its current name for the 1966–67 season and ran for only four consecutive seasons, as in 1970-71 it was abolished. However, the competition returned the following year.

In 1982, a new top-division league (Divisão de Honra) was created and the Segunda Divisão became the 3rd tier of Portuguese handball. Nevertheless, with the creation of the new single round-robin league in 1985, the Second Division returned to be the 2nd tier competition.

In 2001, another rebranding of the top-division led to the Segunda Divisão becoming once again the 3rd tier of Portuguese handball. Moreover, due to the League-Federation dispute, the competition took an even lower standard between 2002 and 2007. During that period, the Segunda Divisão was de facto the 4th tier of the league system, although considered de jure the 3rd tier by the Portuguese Handball Federation.

As the dispute ended, the Segunda Divisão became de facto the 3rd tier of Portuguese handball in 2007.

As the Liga Portuguesa de Clubes de Andebol folded in 2008, the Segunda Divisão is the level 2 league of Portuguese handball since the 2009–2010 season.

Champions

Portuguese handball second division 
1966/1967: Campo de Ourique (1)
1967/1968: Almada AC (1)
1968/1969: Almada AC (2)
1969/1970: Almada AC (3)
1970/1971: Not Played
1971/1972: Atlético Clube de Portugal (1)
1972/1973: B. Espírito Santo (1)
1973/1974: Beira-Mar (1)
1974/1975: São Mamede (1)
1975/1976: FC Maia (1)
1976/1977: Caramão (1)
1977/1978: Sporting de Espinho (1)
1978/1979: Encarnação (1)
1979/1980: Caselas FC (1)
1980/1981: Vitória FC (1)
1981/1982: AD Sanjoanense (1)
1982/1983: ABC (1) (3rd tier)
1983/1984: São Bernardo (1) (3rd tier)
1984/1985: Francisco de Holanda (1) (3rd tier)
1985/1986: GD TAP (1)
1986/1987: Francisco de Holanda (1)
1987/1988: Académica de Coimbra (1)
1988/1989: Boavista (1)
1989/1990: Illiabum (1)
1990/1991: GD TAP (2)
1991/1992: CCD Coelima (1)
1992/1993: AD Fafe (1)
1993/1994: São Mamede (2)
1994/1995: Almada AC (4)
1995/1996: Académico Funchal (1)
1996/1997: Almada AC (5)
1997/1998: São Bernardo (2)
1998/1999: Águas Santas (1)
1999/2000: FC Gaia (1)
2000/2001: CCR Alto do Moinho (1)
2001/2002: Juve Lis (1) (3rd tier)
2002/2003: IFC Torreense (1) (3rd/4th tier)
2003/2004: AS Académico de Leiria (1) (3rd/4th tier)
2004/2005: Avanca (1) (3rd/4th tier)
2005/2006: Empregados do Comércio (1) (3rd/4th tier)
2006/2007: CDE Camões (1) (3rd/4th tier)
2007/2008: CDE Camões (2) (3rd tier)
2008/2009: ISAVE (1) (3rd tier)

Andebol 2 

Note: 
TN: Titles Number

See also 

Men's

 Andebol 1 

 Third Division
 Taça de Portugal
 Supertaça
 Youth Honors

Women's
 First Division
 Taça de Portugal
 Supertaça
 Youth Honors (Women)

References

2
Sports leagues established in 1966
1966 establishments in Portugal
Professional sports leagues in Portugal